Nakshatram is a 2017 Indian Telugu-language cop action-drama film which is written and directed by Krishna Vamsi in his 20th directorial film. Jointly produced by K. Srinivasulu, S. Venugopal and Sajju, it features Sundeep Kishan, Tanish, Regina Cassandra, Pragya Jaiswal, and Prakash Raj in the lead roles, while J. D. Chakravarthy and Sivaji Raja play supporting roles with Sai Dharam Tej in an extended special appearance. It was released on 4 August 2017 to negative reviews.

Plot
Rama Rao (Sundeep Kishan) is an aspiring police officer who was born in a police family - his great-grandfather, grandfather, and father have all served in the police department. To carry out the family legacy, he dreams of becoming an SI and serving the society, so he strives hard to achieve his goal. He, however, was not able to qualify for the job for various reasons. That is when he decides to perform the duties of a cop even without wearing the uniform.

Meanwhile, following a bomb blast that claims many innocent lives, Parasuramaiah IPS (Prakash Raj), the honest police commissioner of Hyderabad, vows to rid the city of terrorist activities. He forms a crack team led by dynamic cop Alexander IPS (Sai Dharam Tej) for the purpose. Meanwhile, Rama Rao gets into a tiff with Rahul (Tanish), the wayward son of Parasuramaiah.

Due to the quarrel, Rama Rao, when going for his police exam interview, gets attacked by Rahul and ends up being late for the exam and thus not getting selected. A grieved Rama Rao wears a police uniform gifted from his lover Jamuna and starts police duty himself. During one such act, he stops a car filled with explosives, but the car accidentally explodes. Investigating this explosion through CCTV footage, Parasuramiah notices a police uniform with Alexander's name labelled and sends Kiran Reddy (Pragya Jaiswal) to bring Rama Rao to him. Rama Rao confesses in front of Parasuramaiah that he did police duty, but Parasuramaiah wants to know where Alexander is. While coming back, Rama Rao questions Jamuna's father, Constable Sitharaman (Sivaji Raja), who was formerly a police officer and is now a heavy drunkard. Sitharam tells a flashback of how Alexander got killed by Rahul and his friends brutally by injecting heavy narcotic poison into him from all sides, and they fit a time bomb on Aleander and release him in the center of the market, as narcotics Alexander falls on women and gets beaten and humiliated, but Alexander runs to the top floor of a building, explodes, and dies.

Rama Rao, hearing this flashback, decides to end Rahul's evil but finally gets attacked in the same way like Alexander and gets released to the middle of the function as human bomb to a function attended by the home minister, with a remote control on Rahul's mobile phone. Sitharam hits the mobile phone away. Meanwhile, Rama Rao manages to enter a car of the minister that has mobile signal jammer. Now, Parasuramaiah, surprised at this behavior stands in doubt. Rahul tries to enter and wants to kill Rama Rao, but Kiran, although previously injured, shoots and kills Rahul.

Cast 

Sundeep Kishan as Rama Rao
Tanish as Rahul
Regina Cassandra as Jamuna
Pragya Jaiswal as Kiran Reddy IPS
Prakash Raj as Parasuramaiah IPS
J. D. Chakravarthy as Ramachandra Naidu
Sivaji Raja as Constable Sitharam
Raghu Babu as Ramdas
Brahmaji as Gopaldas
Thulasi Shivamani as Rama Rao's mother
Viva Harsha as Dance Master
Mukhtar Khan as Mukhtar
 Duvvasi Mohan as Auto Driver
Nalla Venu
Sai Dharam Tej as Alexander IPS (cameo appearance)
Shriya Saran as an item number in the song "Time Ledu Guru"

Soundtrack
The music was composed by Bheems Ceciroleo and released by Aditya Music.

Reception 
A critic from The Hindu wrote that "After 166 minutes of watching one too many gun shots, hearing full-throated cries, high decibel dialogue deliveries and loud music, it felt good when it all ended". A critic from The Times of India wrote that "Nakshatram is clearly Krishna Vamsi’s tribute to the ‘men in khaki’. Having said that, barring Rama Rao’s aspirations and characterisation, the drama evokes a sense of déjà vu".

References 

2017 films
Indian action films
Films directed by Krishna Vamsi
2010s Telugu-language films
2017 action films
Films scored by Bheems Ceciroleo